The Eliteserien is the top association football league in Norway. It was established in 1963 as the 1. divisjon and has consisted of between 10 and 16 teams. Fifty-six different venues have been used to host matches.

Current
The following is a list of all stadia used for matches in the Norwegian top division, including while it was known as the 1. divisjon. It consists of the venue's name, the municipality it where it is located, its current capacity, whether it has natural grass or artificial turf (an asterisk (*) indicates current artificial turf, but previous natural grass), the number of top-league matches contested on the venue, the teams which have played their home games at the venue and how many matches for each team, and the years the stadium was used at the top level. The data is up to date as of the end of the 2019 season.

Future

Notes

References
Bibliography
 

Notes

See also
 List of football stadiums in Norway

Venues